Music for Nurses is a 2004  EP by Oceansize.

Track listing
 "One out of None" (5:40)
 "Paper Champion" (5:45)
 "Drag the 'Nal" (1:45)
 "Dead Dogs an' All Sorts" (4:44)
 "As the Smoke Clears" (7:05)

2004 EPs
Oceansize albums
Beggars Banquet Records EPs